The Egg of Columbus is an apocryphal story about Christopher Columbus. It may also refer to:

Egg of Columbus (mechanical puzzle)
Egg of Columbus (tangram puzzle)
Tesla's Egg of Columbus
Birth of a New Man, statue in Seville also known as Egg of Columbus